No Brand Burger (Korean: 노브랜드 버거), is a fast food hamburger chain based in South Korea. The name was borrowed from No Brand (Korean: 이마트 노브랜드), a private label of e-mart. Also, No Brand Burger's yellow, black, and white color scheme used in its logo, decor, packaging, and Adverts was adopted from No Brand's.



Marketing
No Brand Burger is marketed as being affordable with the cheapest burger starting at 1,900 Korean Won (approximately 1.50 USD) and the most expensive burger costing  6500 Won (approximately 4.50 USD). The hamburger patties and vegetables are supplied from its parent company, Shinsegae Foods. This self-sufficiency increases the operational efficiency making the low pricing possible. Shinsegae Foods had analyzed the consumer experiences from Burger Plant, its other burger chain, in order to develop No Brand Burger's menu.

Han Hyun-min, a South Korean celebrity, was chosen as the brand ambassador of No Brand Burger. He was featured in an advertisement parodying a scene from Dooly the Little Dinosaur.

Locations

The First No Brand Burger restaurant opened in Hongdae in August 2019. There are 10 locations across Seoul, Incheon, and Gyeonggi Province as of January 2020.

See also

 Shinsegae

 Mom's Touch Another South Korean fast food chain.

References

Restaurants in South Korea
Hamburger restaurants
Fast-food restaurants
Fast-food chains of South Korea